Entertainment Express is a Nigerian newspaper founded in July 2011 by journalism masters, Mike Awoyinfa and late Pastor Dimgba Igwe, centered on movies, music, and sports. Among the pioneer staff were Azuh Amatus (Editor), Femi Salawu, Ameh Comrade Godwin. The paper folded up and migrated online in 2014 following the death of Pastor.

References

External links

Newspapers published in Nigeria
Publications established in 2011
Works about entertainment